Kashyapa is a revered Vedic sage of Hinduism. He is one of the Saptarishis, the seven ancient sages of the Rigveda. Kashyapa is the most ancient and venerated rishi, along with the other Saptarishis, listed in the colophon verse in the Brihadaranyaka Upanishad.

Kashyapa is an ancient name, referring to many different personalities in the ancient Hindu and Buddhist texts. The place Kashmir is named after him, as well as numerous other Sanskrit texts and Indian scriptures.

Name
Kashyapa means "turtle" in Sanskrit. According to Michael Witzel, it is related to Avestan kasiiapa, Sogdian kyšph, Kurdish kûsî, New Persian kašaf, kaš(a)p which mean "tortoise", after which Kashaf Rūd or a river in Turkmenistan and Khorasan is named. Other relations include to Tokarian B kaccāp ("brainpan"), Tokarian A kāccap ("turtle", "tortoise"). Frits Staal agrees that Kaśyapa means tortoise but believes that it is a non-Indo-European word.

History
Kashyapa is credited with composing a few hymns in the Rigveda, mainly in Mandala IX. He and his family of students are mainly composers of hymns for Soma Pavamāna ("self-purifying Soma"), which represents a single moment in the Soma sacrifice.

He is mentioned in verse 2.2.4 of the Brihadaranyaka Upanishad, along with Atri, Vashistha, Vishvamitra, Jamadagni, Bharadwaja and Gotama. Kashyapa is also mentioned as the earliest rishi in colophon verse 6.5.3 of Brihadaranyaka Upanishad, one of the oldest Upanishadic scriptures of Hinduism.

Kashyapa is mentioned in other Vedas and numerous other Vedic texts. For example, in one of several cosmology-related hymns of Atharvaveda (~1000 BCE), Kashyapa is mentioned in the allegory-filled Book XIX:

His name appears in Patanjali's ancient bhasya on verse 1.2.64 of Pāṇini. His name is very common in the Epic and Purana literature.

Buddhist texts
In Buddhist Pali canonical texts such as Digha Nikaya, Tevijja Sutta describes a discussion between the Buddha and Vedic scholars of his time. The Buddha names ten rishis, calls them "early sages" and makers of ancient verses that have been collected and chanted in his era, and among those ten rishi is Kassapa (the Pali spelling of Kashyapa in Sanskrit).

Kashmir
Despite its etymological origins being uncertain, Kashmir got its name from Kashyapa Rishi. According to Christopher Snedden, the name Kashmir could have been a shortened form of "Kashyapa Mira", or the "lake of the sage Kashyapa". Alternatively, it may come from a Kashmiri or Sanskrit term that means "to dry up water". It could also have been derived from the term "Kashyapa Meru", which means the sacred mountains of Kashyapa.

In ancient texts of Greece, linked to the expedition of Alexander, this land has been called "Kasperia", possibly a contraction of "Kasyapamira". The word "Kaspapyros" appears in Greek geographer Hekataois text, and as "Kaspatyros" in Herodotus who states that Skylax the Karyandian began in Kaspatyros to trace the path of Indus river from the mountains to where it drained in the sea. Kaspatyros may be same as Kaspa-pyrus or Kashyapa-pura (city of Kashyapa) in other texts.

Legends in Hindu Epics and Puranas
Kashyapa is mentioned in numerous Hindu texts such as the Puranas and the Hindu Epics. The stories related to Kashyapa in different texts are widely inconsistent, and many are considered allegorical. For example, in the Ramayana, he is married to the eight daughters of Daksha, while in the Mahabharata and Vishnu Purana he is described as married to thirteen daughters. Some of the names of the thirteen daughters Kashyapa married in the Hindu text Vishnu Purana are different than the list found in Mahabharata. Some texts describe Kashyapa as the son of Marichi, ancestor of solar dynasty, a contemporary with Uttamapada the second king of Brahmavarta and who married daughters of Daksha Prajapati the son of Brahma, others mention about him marrying daughters of Daksha Prajapati the last king of Brahmavarta, 15 in male descent from Uttamapada. It may be supposed that there have existed several persons named Kashyapa all of whom are usually confounded.

In some Puranas, Kashyapa is said to have drained the Kashmir valley to make it inhabitable. Some interpret this legend to parallel the legend of Buddhist Manjushri draining Nepal and Tibet, wherein the "draining" is an allegory for teaching ideas and doctrines, removing stagnant waters of ignorance and extending learning and civilization into the valley. The Sindh city Multan (now in Pakistan), also called Mulasthana, has been interpreted alternatively as Kashyapapura in some stories after Kashyap. Yet another interpretation has been to associate Kashyapa as River Indus in the Sindh region. However, these interpretations and the links of Multan as Kashyapapura to Kashmir have been questioned.

According to the ancient legends, Kashyapa reclaimed that land from a vast lake, his school was based there, and the land was named after him.

Wives and children
The Puranas and the Epics of Indian tradition mention Kashyapa and his genealogy numerous times. In the Vishnu Purana, Kashyap marries thirteen daughters of Daksha: Aditi, Diti, Kadru, Danu, Arishta, Surasa, Surabhi, Vinata, Tamra, Krodhavasha, Ira, Vishva and Muni, while in the Mahabharata, the names of these 13 wives are Aditi, Diti, Kala, Danayus, Danu, Simhika, Krodha, Pritha, Visva, Vinata, Kapila, Muni and Kadru. There are various interpretations. Scholar Vettam Mani, after analysing the epics and Puranas, concluded that Kashyapa may have married 21 women (13 of which were Daksha's daughters) — Aditi, Diti, Danu, Arishta, Surasha, Khasha, Surabhi, Vinata, Tamra, Krodhavasha, Ira, Kadru, Muni, Puloma, Kalaka, Nata, Danayus, Simhika, Pradha, Visva and Kapila.

Kashyapa, in the Vishnu Purana and Vayu Purana, is attributed to be the father of the Devas, Danavas, Yakshas, Daityas and all living creatures with various daughters of Daksha. He married Aditi, with whom he fathered the Adityas, and in two inconsistent versions Vamana, an avatar of Vishnu, is the child of Aditi and Kashyapa. In these religious texts, Kashyapa is the brother-in-law of Dharma and Adharma, both of whom are also described as married to other daughters of Daksha.

Kashyapa incarnated as Vasudeva
Sage Kaśyapa also incarnated as Vasudeva, the father of Lord Krishna due to a curse that Lord Brahmā unleashed upon him. Once, the sage performed a Yajña (a Vedic ritual) in his hermitage in order to offer oblations to the Devas for the welfare of the beings in the world. To perform the ritual, Sage Kaśyapa required offerings such as milk, ghee etc., for which he sought the help of Lord Varuṇa. When Lord Varuṇa manifested before him, Sage Kaśyapa requested him for a boon of limitless offerings to perform the Yajña successfully. Lord Varuṇa offered him a holy cow which would provide him with limitless offerings. He then told the sage that the holy cow would be taken back once the Yajña was over. The Yajña went on for several days, and with the presence of the holy cow, the sage never faced any obstacles.

Realizing the miraculous power of the cow, he was overcome with greed and desired to own the cow forever. He did not return the cow to Lord Varuṇa even after the Yajña was over. Lord Varuṇa appeared in front of Sage Kaśyapa and told him that the cow was given to him as a boon, only for the Yajña, and now that the Yajña was over, it had to be returned as it belonged to the heaven. Sage Kaśyapa refused to part with the cow and told Lord Varuṇa that whatever is offered to a Brāhmaṇa should never be sought back, and whoever does that would turn out to be a sinner.

Hence, Lord Varuṇa sought the help of Lord Brahmā who appeared before the sage and told him to get rid of his greed which is capable of destroying all his virtues. Nevertheless, Sage Kaśyapa remained firm in his resolve, which enraged Lord Brahmā who cursed him, saying that he would be born on earth again as a cowherd. Sage Kaśyapa repented for his mistake and pleaded Lord Brahmā to forgive him. Lord Brahmā also realized that he had cursed him in a haste, and told him that he would still be born as a cowherd in the Yadava clan, and Lord Vishnu would be born as his son. This was how Sage Kaśyapa was born as Vasudeva and became the father of Lord Krishna.

Attributions
Kashyapa is revered in the Hindu tradition, and numerous legends and texts composed in the medieval era are reverentially attributed to him in various Hindu traditions. Some treatises named after him or attributed to him include:
 Kashyapasamhita, also called Vriddajivakiya Tantra or Jivakiya Tantra, is a classical reference book on Ayurvedic pediatrics, gynecology and obstetrics. It was revised by Vatsya. The treatise is written as a tutorial between the medical sage Kashyapa and his student named Vriddhajivaka, and mostly related to caring for babies and diseases of children.
 Kashyapa Jnanakanda, or Kashyapa's book of wisdom, is a 9th-century text of the Vaishnavism tradition.
 Kaśyapa dharmasutra, likely an ancient text, but now believed to be lost. The text's existence is inferred from quotes and citations by medieval Indian scholars.
 Kaśyapasangīta, likely another ancient text, but now believed to be lost. A treatise on music, it is quoted by Shaivism and Advaita scholar Abhinavagupta, wherein he cites sage Kasyapa explanation on viniyoga of each rasa and bhava. Another Hindu music scholar named Hrdanyangama mentions Kashyapa's contributions to the theory of alankara (musical note decorations).
 Kashyapashilpa, also called Amsumad agama, Kasyapiya or Silpasastra of Kaśyapa, is a Sanskrit treatise on architecture, iconography and the decorative arts, probably completed in the 11th century.

See also

 Atri
 Agastya
 Kassapa Buddha
 Japheth
 Suryavansha
 Ikshvaku dynasty
 Aditi
 Danu (Asura)
 Diti
 Mahākāśyapa
 Kāśyapīya
 House of Suren
 Vasudeva

Notes

References

External links

 The Vedic "Five Tribes", DD Kosambi (1967)

Rishis
Brahmin gotras
Saptarishi